Libuszanka is a river of Poland, a right tributary of the Ropa near Biecz.

Rivers of Poland
Rivers of Lesser Poland Voivodeship